A Story of Children and Film is a 2013 documentary film directed by Mark Cousins. It features clips from movies from around the world that feature children, and scenes featuring the director's niece and nephew.

Films referenced 
The 400 Blows (1959), directed by François Truffaut
Alyonka (1961), directed by Boris Barnet
An Angel at My Table (1991), directed by Jane Campion
Big Business (1929), with Laurel and Hardy, directed by James W. Horne and Leo McCarey
The Bill Douglas Trilogy: My Childhood (1972), directed by Bill Douglas
The Boot (1993), directed by Mohammad-Ali Talebi
Children in the Wind (1937), directed by Hiroshi Shimizu
Crows (1994), directed by Dorota Kędzierzawska 
Curly Top (1935), with Shirley Temple, directed by Irving Cummings
Emil and the Detectives (1931), directed by Gerhard Lamprecht
E.T. the Extra-Terrestrial (1982), directed by Steven Spielberg
Fanny and Alexander (1982), directed by Ingmar Bergman
Finlandia (1922), directed by Erkki Karu
Forbidden Games (1952), directed by René Clément
Frankenstein (1931), directed by James Whale
Freedom Is Paradise (1989), directed by Sergey Bodrov
Gasman (1998), directed by Lynne Ramsay
Ghatashraddha (1977), directed by Girish Kasaravalli
Great Expectations (1946), directed by David Lean
A Hometown in Heart (1949), directed by Yoon Yong-Kyu
Hugo and Josephine (1967), directed by Kjell Grede
I Wish (2011), directed by Hirokazu Koreeda
An Inn in Tokyo (1935), directed by Yasujirō Ozu
Kauwboy (2012), directed by Boudewijn Koole
Kes (1969), directed by Ken Loach
The Kid (1921), directed by Charlie Chaplin
The Little Girl Who Sold the Sun (1999), directed by Djibril Diop Mambéty
Long Live the Republic (1965), directed by Karel Kachyňa
Meet Me in St. Louis (1944), directed by Vincente Minnelli
Melody for a Street Organ (2009), directed by Kira Muratova
Mirror (1975), directed by Andrei Tarkovsky
A Mouse in the House (1947), with Tom and Jerry, directed by William Hanna and Joseph Barbera
Moonrise Kingdom (2012), directed by Wes Anderson
Moving (1993), directed by Shinji Sōmai
The Newest City in the World (1974), directed by Xhanfise Keko
The Night of the Hunter (1955), directed by Charles Laughton
Nobody Knows (2004), directed by Hirokazu Koreeda
Los Olvidados (1950), directed by Luis Buñuel
Palle Alone in the World (1949), directed by Astrid Henning-Jensen
The Red Balloon (1953), directed by Albert Lamorisse
The Spirit of the Beehive (1973), directed by Víctor Erice
The Steamroller and the Violin (1961), directed by Andrei Tarkovsky
Ten Minutes Older (1978), directed by Herz Frank
Tomka and His Friends (1977), directed by Xhanfise Keko
Two Solutions for One Problem (1975), directed by Abbas Kiarostami
The Unseen (1996), directed by Miroslav Janek
The White Balloon (1995), directed by Jafar Panahi
Willow and Wind (1999), directed by Mohammad-Ali Talebi
Yaaba (1989), directed by Idrissa Ouedraogo
The Yellow Balloon (1953), directed by J. Lee Thompson
Yellow Earth (1984), directed by Chen Kaige
Zero for Conduct (1933), directed by Jean Vigo

External links 

2013 films
2013 documentary films
Documentary films about children
Documentary films about films
Films directed by Mark Cousins